Spink may refer to:

 Spink, County Laois, a village in Ireland
 Spink County, South Dakota, US
 Spink Township, Union County, South Dakota, US
 Spink & Son, a UK auction and collectibles company
 Spink GAA, a Gaelic football club in Ireland
 The Spink, a historic apartment building in Indianapolis, Indiana, US
 Common chaffinch, a small bird in the finch family

People with the surname
 Alfred H. Spink, sportswriter
 Bob Spink, UK politician, former Conservative MP
 Cliff Spink (born 1946), retired RAF officer
 Jimmy Spink (1890–1943), English footballer
 Michael Spink, property developer
 Nigel Spink, former Aston Villa goalkeeper
 Roger Spink (born 1958), Falkland Islands politician
 Solomon L. Spink (1831–1881), American lawyer
 Wesley W. Spink (1904–1988), American physician and medical researcher

See also
 Spinka (Hasidic dynasty)
 Spinks, a surname